Encore! (Travels with My Cello – Volume 2) is a 1986 studio album by the British cellist Julian Lloyd Webber, a sequel to the 1984 collection Travels with my Cello.

Track listing:

 Bless, You is My Woman Now by Gershwin
 Nocturne by Taube
 Rondo alla Turca by Mozart
 Claire de Lune by Debussy
 Skye Boat Song by Traditional
 Habanera by Bizet
 Un Apres-midi by Vangelis
 Song of the Seashore by Narita
 When I'm Sixty-Four by Lennon–McCartney
 Somewhere by Bernstein
 Jesu. Joy of Man's Desiring by Bach
 Chant Hindou by Rimsky-Korsakov
 You are My Heart's Delight by Lehár

Royal Philharmonic Orchestra/Nicholas Cleobury

Philips CD 416 698-2

External links 
  Vol.2 reviews

1984 albums
Julian Lloyd Webber albums